The Volkswagen Beetle—officially the Volkswagen Type 1, informally in German  (meaning "beetle"), in parts of the English-speaking world the Bug, and known by many other nicknames in other languages—is a two-door, rear-engine economy car, intended for five occupants (later, Beetles were restricted to four people in some countries), that was manufactured and marketed by German automaker Volkswagen (VW) from 1938 until 2003.

The need for a people's car ( in German), its concept and its functional objectives were formulated by the leader of Nazi Germany, Adolf Hitler, who wanted a cheap, simple car to be mass-produced for his country's new road network (Reichsautobahn). Members of the National Socialist party, with an additional dues surcharge, were promised the first production, but the Spanish Civil War shifted most production resources to military vehicles to support the Nationalists under Francisco Franco.

Lead engineer Ferdinand Porsche and his team took until 1938 to finalise the design. Béla Barényi is credited with conceiving the original basic design for this car in 1925, notably by Mercedes-Benz, on their website, including his original technical drawing, five years before Porsche claimed to have done his initial version. The influence on Porsche's design of other contemporary cars, such as the Tatra V570, and the work of Josef Ganz remains a subject of dispute. The result was the first Volkswagen, and one of the first rear-engined cars since the Brass Era. With 21,529,464 produced, the Beetle is the longest-running and most-manufactured car of a single platform ever made.

Although designed in the 1930s, due to World War II, civilian Beetles only began to be produced in significant numbers by the end of the 1940s. The car was then internally designated the Volkswagen Type 1, and marketed simply as the Volkswagen. Later models were designated Volkswagen 1200, 1300, 1500, 1302, or 1303, the first three indicating engine displacement, the last two derived from the model number.

The car became widely known in its home country as the Käfer (German for "beetle", cognate with English chafer) and was later marketed under that name in Germany, and as the Volkswagen in other countries.

The original 25 hp (18.6 kW) Beetle was designed for a top speed around 100 km/h (62 mph), which would be a viable cruising speed on the Reichsautobahn system. As Autobahn speeds increased in the postwar years, its output was boosted to 36, then 40 hp (26.8, then 29.8 kW), the configuration that lasted through 1966 and became the "classic" Volkswagen motor. The Beetle gave rise to multiple variants: mainly the 1950 Type 2 'Bus', the 1955 Karmann Ghia, as well as the 1961 Type 3 'Ponton' and the 1968 Type 4 (411/412) family cars, ultimately forming the basis of an entirely rear-engined VW product range.

The Beetle marked a significant trend, led by Volkswagen, and then by Fiat and Renault, whereby the rear-engine, rear-wheel-drive layout increased from 2.6 percent of continental Western Europe's car production in 1946 to 26.6 percent in 1956. In 1959 even General Motors launched an air-cooled, rear-engined car, the Chevrolet Corvair—which also shared the Beetle's flat engine and swing axle architecture.

Over time, front-wheel drive, and frequently hatchback-bodied cars would come to dominate the European small-car market. In 1974, Volkswagen's own front-wheel drive Golf hatchback succeeded the Beetle. In 1994, Volkswagen unveiled the Concept One, a "retro"-themed concept car with a resemblance to the original Beetle, and in 1998 introduced the "New Beetle", built on the contemporary Golf platform with styling recalling the original Type 1. It remained in production through 2010, and was succeeded in 2011 by the Beetle (A5), the last variant of the Beetle, which was also more reminiscent of the original Beetle. Production ceased altogether by 2019.

In the 1999 Car of the Century competition, to determine the world's most influential car in the 20th century, the Type 1 came fourth, after the Ford Model T, the Mini, and the Citroën DS.

History

"The People's Car" 

The original concept behind the first Volkswagen, the company, and its name is the notion of a people’s car – a car affordable and practical enough for common people to own. Hence the name, which is literally "people's car" in German, pronounced ). Although the Volkswagen Beetle was mainly the brainchild of Ferdinand Porsche and Adolf Hitler, the idea of a "people's car" is much older than Nazism and has existed since the mass-production of cars was introduced. In fact, Béla Barényi was able to prove in court in 1953 that Porsche's patents infringed on Barényi's ideas, and therefore Barényi has since been credited with first conceiving the original basic design for this car in 1925. This was noted on the Mercedes-Benz website, including Barényi's original technical drawing, dated five years before Ferdinand Porsche claimed to have made his initial version. Barényi also successfully sued Volkswagen for copyright infringement in 1955, whereby his contribution to the creation of the VW Type 1 was legally acknowledged.

Contrary to the situation in the United States, where the Ford Model T had become the first car to motorize the masses, contributing to household car ownership of about 33% in 1920 and some 46% in 1930, in the early 1930s, the German auto industry was still mostly limited to luxury models, and few Germans could afford anything more than a motorcycle: one German out of 50 owned a car.

In April 1934, Hitler gave the order to Porsche to develop a Volkswagen. The epithet Volks-, literally "people's-", had been applied to other Nazi-sponsored consumer goods as well, such as the Volksempfänger ("people's radio").

In May 1934, at a meeting at Berlin's Kaiserhof Hotel, Hitler insisted on a basic vehicle that could transport two adults and three children at  while not using more than 7 litres of fuel per 100 km (32 mpg US/39 mpg UK). The engine had to be powerful enough for sustained cruising on Germany's Autobahnen. Everything had to be designed to ensure parts could be quickly and inexpensively exchanged. The engine had to be air-cooled because, as Hitler explained, not every country doctor had his own garage. (Ethylene glycol antifreeze was only just beginning to be used in high-performance liquid-cooled aircraft engines. In general, water in radiators would freeze unless the vehicle was kept in a heated building overnight or drained and refilled each morning.)

Due to the outbreak of war in 1939, none of the participants in the savings scheme ever received a car. In 1950 a lawsuit was issued that, after 12 years of trial, ultimately provided a credit of 12% off the list price of a new VW base model or less than five times the money paid into the saving scheme.

Development 
Ferdinand Porsche developed the Type 12, or "Auto für Jedermann" (car for everybody) for Zündapp in 1931. Porsche already preferred the flat-four engine, and selected a swing axle rear suspension (invented by Edmund Rumpler), while Zündapp insisted on a water-cooled five-cylinder radial engine. In 1932 three prototypes were running; all were lost during World War II, the last in a bombing raid in Stuttgart in 1945.

The Zündapp prototypes were followed by the Porsche Type 32, designed in 1933 for NSU Motorenwerke AG, another motorcycle company.  The Type 32 was similar in design to the Type 12, but it had a flat-four engine. NSU discontinued car manufacturing, and the Type 32 was abandoned at the prototype stage.

Initially designated Type 60 by Porsche, the design team included Erwin Komenda and Karl Rabe. In October 1935, the first two Type-60 prototypes, known as cars V1, a sedan, and V2 , a convertible (V for Versuchswagen, or "test car"), were ready. In 1936 testing began of three further V3 prototypes, built in Porsche's Stuttgart shop. A batch of thirty W30 development models, produced for Porsche by Daimler-Benz, underwent  of further testing in 1937. All cars had the distinctive round shape and the air-cooled, rear-mounted engine. Included in this batch was a rollback soft top called the Cabrio Limousine. A further batch of 44 VW38 pre-production cars produced in 1938 introduced split rear windows; both the split window and the dash were retained on production Type 1s until 1953. The VW38 cars were followed by another batch of 50 VW39 cars, completed in July 1939.

The car was designed to be as simple as possible mechanically. The air-cooled   motor's built-in oil cooler, and the flat-four engine configuration's superior performance was also effective for the German Afrika Korps in Africa's desert heat. The suspension design used compact torsion bars instead of coil or leaf springs. According to a 1972 commercial, the Beetle was nearly airtight and would briefly float.

Factory 
On 26 May 1938, Hitler laid the cornerstone for the Volkswagen factory in Fallersleben. He gave a speech, in which he named the car Kraft-durch-Freude-Wagen ("Strength Through Joy Car", usually abbreviated to KdF-Wagen). The name refers to Kraft durch Freude ('Strength Through Joy'), the official leisure organization of Nazi Germany. The model village of Stadt des KdF-Wagens was created near Fallersleben in Lower Saxony in 1938 for the benefit of the workers at the newly built factory.

Volkswagen had only just started small scale production, building about 210 Beetles, when civilian production was halted at the start of the war. Except for two military prototype units, these KdF sedans were allocated to military officers as personal cars. Hitler was given the very first convertible Beetle built in 1938. Both 704cc and 984cc air-cooled engines were fitted in these early units.

The first volume-produced versions of the car's running-gear and chassis were military vehicles, the Type 82 Kübelwagen (approximately 52,000 built) and the amphibious Type 128 and 166 Schwimmwagen (about 14,000 built).

Wartime production 

A handful of KdF-Wagen were produced, primarily for the Nazi elite, from 1941 to 1944, as the Typ 60. During World War II, the factory primarily built the Kübelwagen (Typ 82), the Schwimmwagen (Typ 166), and a handful of other light wheeled vehicles, all mechanically derived from the Typ 1, for the Wehrmacht. These included several hundred Kommandeurswagen (Typ 87), with a Typ 1 Beetle body mounted on the rugged chassis of the four-wheel drive Typ 86 Kübelwagen prototype, and fitted with portal axle and a Schwimmwagen drive train, with wider fenders., to accommodate oversize Kronprinz all-terrain tires (reminiscent of the later Baja Bugs). Kommandeurswagen were produced up to 1944, when all production was halted because of heavy damage to the factory from Allied air raids. Much of the essential equipment had already been moved to underground bunkers for protection, which let production resume quickly after hostilities ended. Due to gasoline shortages late in the war, a few "Holzbrenner" Beetles were built, which were fueled with logs of wood. The logs were converted into combustible gases using pyrolysis gas producers located under the front hood, so the car could retain its carbureted Otto engine.

Post-war production and boom 

In occupied Germany, the Allies followed the Morgenthau plan to remove all German war potential by complete or partial pastoralization. As part of this, in the Industrial plans for Germany, the rules for which industry Germany was to be allowed to retain were set out. German car production was set at a maximum of 10 percent of the 1936 car production numbers.

Mass production of civilian VW cars did not start until post-war occupation. The Volkswagen factory was handed over by the Americans to British control in 1945; it was to be dismantled and shipped to Britain. However, no British car manufacturer was interested in the factory; an official report included the phrases "the vehicle does not meet the fundamental technical requirement of a motor-car… it is quite unattractive to the average buyer…  To build the car commercially would be a completely uneconomic enterprise." The factory survived by producing cars for the British Army instead. Allied dismantling policy changed in late 1946 to mid-1947, although heavy industry continued to be dismantled until 1951. In March 1947, Herbert Hoover helped change policy by stating

The re-opening of the factory is largely accredited to British Army officer Major Ivan Hirst. Hirst was ordered to take control of the heavily bombed factory, which the Americans had captured. His first task was to remove an unexploded bomb that had fallen through the roof and lodged itself between some pieces of irreplaceable production equipment; if the bomb had exploded, the Beetle's fate would have been sealed. Knowing Germany needed jobs and the British Army needed vehicles, Hirst persuaded the British military to order 20,000 cars, and by March 1946 the factory was producing 1,000 cars a month (in Army khaki, under the name Volkswagen Type 1), which Hirst said "was the limit set by the availability of materials". During this period, the car reverted to its original name of Volkswagen and the town was renamed Wolfsburg.  The first 1,785 Type 1s were made in 1945.

After initially building mostly Beetles for the British military, in 1947 production transitioned to purely civilian Beetles, for the first time featuring chromed bumpers, hubcaps, and body and running board trim. Aside from some remaining military production, civilian output reached almost 9,000 units in 1947, and for 1948 total production increased to 19,244 cars. The late 1940s Beetles still had an understressed 1131 cc engine with just 25 horsepower, but it could effortlessly maintain cruising at the car's  top speed. This was already an enlarged engine, compared to the finalized pre-war design, and in some export markets, these early civilian models were therefore labeled the Type 11.

Following the British Army-led restart of production and Hirst's establishment of sales network and exports to Netherlands, former Opel manager (and formerly a detractor of the Volkswagen) Heinz Nordhoff was appointed director of the Volkswagen factory in 1949. Under Nordhoff, production increased dramatically over the following decade, with the one-millionth car coming off the assembly line by 1955. This was far superior to the Citroën 2CV, which was aimed at a low speed/poor road rural peasant market, and Morris Minor, designed for a market with no motorways or freeways; it was even competitive with more advanced small city cars like the Austin Mini upon its introduction in 1959.

In Small Wonder, Walter Henry Nelson wrote:

There were other, less-numerous models, as well. A total of 696 convertible Hebmüller Cabriolets were built between 1949 and 1953, and 203 Type 18As, a canvas-doored cabriolet, were produced by Austro-Tatra as a police and fire unit between January 1950 and March 1953.

The chassis became a technological and parts donor to the original VW Bus, officially the Volkswagen Type 2, (also known as Bulli) and external coachbuilders such as Rometsch, Dannenhauer & Stauss, Wilhelm Karmann, Enzmann, Beutler, Ghia-Aigle, Hebmüller & Söhne, Drews, Wendler.

On 17 February 1972 Beetle No. 15,007,034 was produced, surpassing total production of the previous record holder, the Ford Model T. By 1973, total production was over 16 million, and by 23 June 1992, over 21 million had been produced.

Decline 

Though extremely successful in the 1960s, experiencing its greatest sales growth in North America between 1960 and 1965, the Beetle was increasingly faced with stiff competition from more modern designs globally. The Japanese had refined rear-wheel-drive, water-cooled, front-engine, small cars including the Datsun 510 and Toyota Corolla, whose sales in the North American market grew rapidly at the expense of Volkswagen in the late 1960s. Honda introduced the N600, based on the space-efficient transverse-engine, front-wheel-drive layout of the original Austin Mini, to the North American market in late 1969, and upgraded the model to the Honda Civic in 1972.  The Japanese "big three" would soon dominate compact auto sales in North America.  In 1971 Ford introduced its Pinto, which had some market impact as a low cost alternative in the wake of the drop of the US Dollar against the Deutsche Mark that same year.  As the 1960s came to a close, Volkswagen faced increasingly stiff competition from European cars as well.  The Beetle was faced with competition from new designs like the Fiat 127 and Renault 5, and more robust designs based on the Austin Mini layout such as the Superminis. German competitors, Ford and Opel also enjoyed strong sales of modern smaller cars like the Ford Escort and Opel Kadett.  Volkswagen's attempts to boost the power of their air-cooled motor to meet the demands of higher highway speeds in the late 1960s, then comply with new pollution control regulations, caused problems for reliability and fuel efficiency that impaired the reputation of the aging design.  Safety issues with the Beetle came under increasing scrutiny, culminating in the 1972 release of a rather scathing report. During the early 1970s, sales of the Beetle in Europe and North America plummeted.

VW introduced other models to supplement the Beetle throughout the 1960s; the Type 3, Type 4, and the NSU-based and larger K70.  None of these models, aimed at more upscale markets, achieved the level of success of the Beetle. The over-reliance on a single model, now in decline, meant that Volkswagen was in financial crisis by 1974. It needed German government funding to produce the Beetle's replacement.

Production lines at Wolfsburg switched to the new water-cooled, front-engined, front-wheel-drive Golf designed by Giorgetto Giugiaro in 1974, sold in North America at the time as the "Rabbit".  The Golf eventually became Volkswagen's most successful model since the Beetle. It was periodically redesigned over its lifetime, with only a few components carried over between generations, entering its eighth generation in 2019; the Beetle had only minor refinements of its original design.

The Golf did not kill Beetle production, nor did the smaller Polo which was launched a year later. Production of the Beetle continued in smaller numbers at other German factories until 19 January 1978, when mainstream production shifted to Brazil and Mexico: markets where low operating cost was an important factor. After this shift in production, sales in Europe did not stop, but became very low. Beetle sedans were produced for U.S. markets until July 1977 and for European markets until 1985, with other companies continuing to import cars produced in Mexico after 1985. The Beetle convertible/Cabriolet ended production (as 1979 models) on 31 January 1980.

The last Beetle was produced in Puebla, Mexico, in July 2003. The final batch of 3,000 Beetles were sold as 2004 models and badged as the Última Edición, with whitewall tires, a host of previously discontinued chrome trim, and the choice of two special paint colors taken from the New Beetle. Production in Brazil ended in 1986, then started again in 1993 and continued until 1996.

The Beetle outlasted most other cars which had adopted the rear-engine, air-cooled layout such as those by Subaru, Fiat, and General Motors. Porsche's 356 series, which originally used some Volkswagen-sourced parts, continued to use the classic rear-engine layout, as did its successor, the 911 series (which switched to water cooling in the 996 generation of the 911 onwards).

Worldwide end of production 

By 2002, over 21 million Type 1s had been produced, but by 2003, annual production had dropped to 30,000 from a peak of 1.3 million in 1971. VW announced the end of production in June 2003, citing decreasing demand, and the final original Type 1 VW Beetle (No. 21,529,464) rolled off the production line at Puebla, Mexico, on 30 July 2003, 65 years after its original launch. This last Beetle, nicknamed El Rey (Spanish for "The King" after a legendary Mexican song by José Alfredo Jiménez) was delivered to the company's museum in Wolfsburg, Germany.

To celebrate the occasion, Volkswagen marketed a final, special series of 3,000 Beetles marketed as "Última Edición" (Final Edition) in light blue (Aquarius Blue) or beige (Harvest Moon Beige). Each car included the 1.6 engine, whitewall tires, a CD player with four speakers, chrome bumpers, trim, hub caps and exterior mirrors, a Wolfsburg emblem above the front trunk's handle, an all-cloth interior, chrome glove box badge, body coloured wheels, tinted glass, a rear parcel shelf, and VW Última Edición plaque.

A mariachi group serenaded production of the last car. In Mexico, there was an advertising campaign as a goodbye for the Beetle. In one of the ads was a very small parking space on the street, and many big cars tried to use it, but could not. After a while, a sign appears in that parking space saying: "Es increíble que un auto tan pequeño deje un vacío tan grande" (It is incredible that a car so small can leave such a large void). Another depicted the rear end of a 1954 Beetle (the year Volkswagen was established in Mexico) in the left side of the ad, reading "Erase una vez..." (Once upon a time...) and the last 2003 Beetle in the right side, reading "Fin" (The end). Other ads also had the same nostalgic tone.

 Engine: Fuel-injected (Bosch Digifant) four-cylinder horizontally opposed, 1,584 cc,  @ 2,200 rpm, three-way catalytic converter
 Rated fuel mileage: 
 Max cruising speed: 
 Brakes: front disc, rear drum
 Passengers: Five
 Tank: 
 Colours: Aquarius blue, Harvest Moon beige.

Prototypes

Diesel 

In 1951, Volkswagen prototyped a 1.3 L diesel engine. Volkswagen made only two of these naturally aspirated, air-cooled boxer diesel engines, and installed one engine in a Type 1 and another in a Type 2. The diesel Beetle was time tested on the Nürburgring and achieved 0–100 km/h (0–62 mph) in 60 seconds.

Design 

The Beetle featured a rear-located, air-cooled four-cylinder, boxer engine and rear-wheel drive in a two-door bodywork featuring a flat front windscreen, accommodating four passengers and providing luggage storage under the front bonnet and behind the rear seat—and offering a coefficient of drag of 0.48; to this – for a 1930s car – relatively good Cd, the also streamlined rear of the car was of help. The bodywork attached with eighteen bolts to the Beetle's nearly flat platform chassis which featured a central structural tunnel. Front and rear suspension featured torsion bars along with a front stabilizer bar—providing independent suspension at all wheels, albeit that the front axle was designed with double longitudinal trailing arms, whereas the rear axle was a simple swing axle. Certain initial features were subsequently revised, including mechanical drum brakes, split-window rear windows, mechanical direction-indicators, and the non-synchronized gearbox. Other features, including its distinctive overall shape, endured. In fact, the Beetle was prized for its seemingly unchanged appearance and "marketed to American consumers as the anti-GM and Ford: 'We do not believe in planned obsolescence. We don't change a car for the sake of change.'"

The Beetle's engine, transmission, and cylinder heads were constructed of light alloy. An engine oil cooler (located in the engine fan's shroud) ensured optimal engine operating temperature and long engine life, optimized by a thermostat that bypassed the oil cooler when the engine was cold. Later models featured an automatic choke. Engine intake air passed through a metallic filter, while heavier particles were captured by an oil bath. After 1960, steering featured a hydraulic damper that absorbed steering irregularities.

Indicative of the car's utilitarian design, the interior featured painted metal surfaces, a metal dash consolidating instruments in a single, circular binnacle, adjustable front seats, a fold-down rear seat, optional swing-out rear windows, front windows with pivoting vent windows, heating via air-to-air exchange manifolds operating off the engine's heat, and a windshield washer system that eschewed the complexity and cost of an additional electric pump and instead received its pressurization from the car's spare tire (located in the front luggage compartment) which was accordingly overinflated to accommodate the washer function.

Throughout its production, VW marketed the Beetle with a four-speed manual transmission. From 1961 (and almost exclusively in Europe), VW offered an optional version of the Saxomat semi-automatic transmission: a regular 4-speed manual gearbox coupled to an electromagnetic clutch with a centrifugal clutch used for idle. Subsequently, (beginning in 1967 in Europe and 1968 in the United States), VW offered an optional semi-automatic transmission (marketed as Automatic Stick Shift and also called AutoStick,) which was a 3-speed manual coupled to an electro-pneumatic clutch and torque converter.

While the overall appearance of the Beetle changed little over its life span, it received over 78,000 incremental changes during its production.

Evolution and design changes

Beetle cabriolet 

It was in 1948 that Wilhelm Karmann first bought a VW Beetle sedan and converted it into a four-seated convertible.  After successfully presenting it at VW in Wolfsburg the Beetle Cabriolet began production in 1949 by Karmann in Osnabrück.

The convertible was more than a Beetle with a folding top. To compensate for the strength lost in removing the roof, the sills were reinforced with welded U-channel rails, a transverse beam was fitted below the front edge of the rear seat cushion, and the side cowl-panels below the instrument panel were double-wall. In addition, the lower corners of the door apertures had welded-in curved gussets, and the doors had secondary alignment wedges at the B-pillar.

The top was cabriolet-style with a full inner headliner hiding the folding mechanism and crossbars. The rear window was tempered safety glass, and after 1968, heated. Due to the thickness of the top, it remained quite tall when folded. To enable the driver to see over the lowered top, the inside rearview was mounted on an offset pivot.

The convertible was generally more lavishly equipped than the sedan with dual rear ashtrays, twin map pockets, a visor vanity mirror on the passenger side, rear stone shields, and through 1969, wheel trim rings. Many of these items did not become available on other Beetles until the advent of the optional "L" (Luxus) Package of 1970.

After a number of stylistic and technical alterations made to the Karmann cabriolet, (corresponding to the many changes VW made to the Beetle throughout its history), the last of 331,847 cabriolets came off the production line on 10 January 1980.

1950–1959 models

During this period, myriad changes were made throughout the vehicle beginning with the availability of hydraulic brakes and a folding fabric sunroof in 1950.  The rear window of the VW Beetle evolved from a divided or "split" oval, to a singular oval. The change occurred between October 1952 and March 1953. Beetles built during this time were known as a "Zwitter", or "hybrid", as they used the split-window bodyshell with oval-model chrome trim, vent windows and dashboard.

1953 models received a redesigned instrument panel.  The one-piece "Pope's Nose" combination license plate/brake light was replaced by a smaller flat-bottomed license plate light. The brake light function was transferred to new heart-shaped lamps located in the top of the taillight housings.

In 1954, Volkswagen added  to the cylinder bore, increasing the displacement from 1,131 (1100) cc to 1,192 (1200) cc. This coincided with upgrades to various key components including a redesign of the crankshaft. At the same time, compression ratios were progressively raised as, little by little, the octane ratings of available fuel was raised in major markets during the 1950s and 1960s.

In 1955, the separate brake lights were discontinued and were combined into a new larger taillight housing.  The traditional VW semaphore turn signals were replaced by conventional flashing directional indicator lamps for North America.

For 1956, the Beetle received what would become one of its more distinctive features, a set of twin chrome tailpipes. Models for North America gained taller bumper guards and tubular overrider bars.

For 1958, the Beetle received a revised instrument panel, and a larger rectangular rear window replaced the previous oval design.

1960–1969 models

1960 models received a front anti roll bar along with hydraulic steering damper.

For the 1961 model year (from August 1960 onwards), significant technical advances occurred in the form of a new engine (engine code D) and transmission. Volkswagen achieved this by increasing the engine's compression (ε) from 6.6 to 7.0. This also resulted in the engine now requiring fuel with a higher octane rating of 87 RON.

The single-barrel Solex carburetor received an electric automatic choke and the transmission was now synchronized on all forward gears. The traditional semaphore turn signals were replaced by conventional flashing directional indicators worldwide. The standard model called the TYPE 111–112, continued to use the 30 PS 1200 engine of the old architecture that dates back to Franz Reimspiess original design of 1937 all the way until the end of the 1965 model year.

For 1962, the Beetle received a mechanical fuel level gauge in place of the former fuel tap. The Standard model continued without a gas gauge until the end of the 1965 model year. At the rear, larger tail lights were introduced incorporating a separate amber turn signal section to meet new European standards (these turn signals remained red in the US market until 1973). The former hand-pump style windscreen washer was replaced by a new design using compressed air. A Schrader valve located on the washer fluid tank allowed the system to be charged at a filling station to the recommended .

1964 models could be identified by a widened light housing on the engine lid over the rear license plate, however the standard model continued to use the old teardrop style to the end of the 1965 model run.

The largest change to date for the Beetle was in 1965: the majority of the body stampings were revised, which allowed for significantly larger windows. The windshield increased in area by 11% and was now slightly curved, rather than flat. Door windows increased accordingly by 6% (and door vent window edges were canted slightly back), rear side windows 17.5%, and the rear window 19.5%. The result was a more open, airy, modern look.

For 1966, the big news was an optional new 1300cc  engine in lieu of the previous 1200cc engine that had been the sole engine since 1954. Models so equipped carried a "1300" badge on the engine lid. The 1300cc engine was standard for North America.

For 1967, a yet-again larger-displacement engine was made available: 1500cc,  at 4,200 rpm. The 1200 and 1300 engines continued to be available, as many markets based their taxation on engine size. The 1500cc Beetles were equipped with front disc brakes and were identified with a "VW 1500" badge on the engine lid. North America received the 1500 engine as standard equipment, but did not receive front disc brakes. These models were identified by a "Volkswagen" badge on the engine lid.

The rear suspension was significantly revised and included a widened track, softer torsion bars and the addition of a unique Z-configuration equalizing torsion spring. On US, UK, and Ireland models, the generator output was increased from 180 to 360 watts, and the entire electrical system was upgraded from 6 to 12 volts. The clutch disc also increased in size and changes were made to the flywheel. New equipment included a driver's armrest on the door and locking buttons on both doors. Safety improvements included two-speed windscreen wipers, reversing lights (in some markets), and a driver's side mirror. In accord with the newly enacted US Federal Motor Vehicle Safety Standard 108, North American models received a dual-circuit brake system, the clear glass headlamp covers were deleted; the headlamps were brought forward to the leading edge of the front fenders, and the sealed-beam units were exposed and surrounded by chrome bezels. In the rest of the world markets, the 1967 model retained the older headlights. For 1967 North American market Beetles the engine lid was shortened, and reshaped to accommodate the optional 1500 engine. Midway through the ‘67 model year, the North American market rear bumper overrider tubes were redesigned to taper downwards inboard of the bumper guards. The Brazilian market model (Volkswagen Fusca) retained the pre-1967 headlamps until 1972.

1968 was a year of major change. The most noticeable of which were the new larger, higher mounted C-section bumpers. At the rear, new larger taillamps were adopted and were able to accommodate reversing lamps, which were previously separate bumper-mounted units. Beetles worldwide received the '67 North American style vertical headlamp placement, but with replaceable-bulb headlamps compliant with ECE regulations rather than the US sealed beams. Other improvements were a new outside gas filler with spring-loaded flap, eliminating the need to open the trunk to refuel. The fuel gauge was integrated with the speedometer and was now electrically actuated rather than cable-operated. A pressure valve in the connecting hose closed airflow to the fluid reservoir if spare tire pressure fell below , which was above the recommended pressures for the road tires. A ventilation system was introduced, which drew fresh air into the cabin from louvres on the front decklid.

A number of safety improvements were made in order to comply with new American safety regulations: these included trigger-operated outside door handles, a secondary front hood latch, collapsing steering column, soft vent window latches, rotary glove compartment latch and instrument panel knobs labeled with pictographs. US models received a padded instrument panel that was optional in other markets. To meet North American head restraint requirements, VW developed the industry's first high-back bucket seat. The Standard model 111–112, called the 1200 "A" still used the 1200 engine but for the first time for Europe it came with a 12 volt system.

A new 3-speed semi-automatic transmission with torque converter and vacuum-operated clutch became available mid-production year. The semi-automatic models received a vastly improved semi-trailing-arm rear suspension (also known as "independent rear suspension" although the earlier swing axle Beetles were also independent) and eliminated the need for the equalizing torsion spring. This new rear suspension layout would eventually become an option on later models. Beetles equipped with the automatic were identified with a "VW Automatic" badge on the engine lid and a matching decal in the rear window. In North America, the badging and decal were later revised to read, "Automatic Stick Shift".

For 1969, the only exterior change was the fuel filler flap no longer had a finger indentation due to a new interior-mounted fuel door release. For North America, the Beetle received a heated rear window, day/night mirror and the semi-trailing, independent suspension with double jointed swing axles as standard equipment. In other markets, manual transmission models retained a swing axle independent suspension which would continue until the end of German Beetle production.

1970–1979 models

In 1970, a new "L" (Luxus) Package was introduced including, among other items, twin map pockets, dual rear ashtrays, full carpeting, a passenger-side visor vanity mirror, and rubber bumper moldings. The optional 1500 cc engine now came with an engine lid having two rows of cooling louvers, while the convertible's engine lid gained two additional sets for a total of four. For North America, the 1500 cc engine was enlarged to 1600 cc engine and produced 

There were two Beetles for the first time in 1971, the familiar standard Beetle and a new, larger version, different from the windscreen forward. All Beetles received an engine upgrade: the optional 1500 cc engine was replaced by a 1600 cc with twin-port cylinder heads and a larger, relocated oil cooler. The new engine produced . The ventilation system was improved with the original dash-top vents augmented by a second pair aimed directly at the driver and passenger. For the first time the system was a flow-through design with crescent-shaped air exits fitted behind the rear quarter windows. Airflow could be increased via an optional 2-speed fan. The standard Beetle was now badged as the VW 1300; when equipped with the 1600 engine, it was badged 1300 S, to avoid confusion with the Type 3, which wore VW 1600 badges.

The new suspension layout allowed the spare tire to be positioned flat under the trunk floor. Although the car had to be lengthened slightly to accomplish this, it allowed a reduction in turning radius. To gain additional trunk volume, the under-dash panel was lowered, allowing the fuel tank to be shifted rearward. From the windscreen back the big Beetle was identical to its smaller progenitor, except for having the also new semi-trailing arm rear suspension as standard equipment. Overall, the bigger Beetle was  longer,  wider, and rode on a -longer wheelbase. Both Beetles were available with or without the L Package. The convertible was now based on the 1302 body. In North America, the 1302 was marketed as the Super Beetle and came only with the L Package and 1600 cc engine. While it lacked the front disc brakes that normally accompanied the larger motor, it was fitted with brake drums that were slightly larger than the standard Beetle. With the Super Beetle being sold as the premium model in North America, the standard Beetle, while retaining the same 1600 cc engine, was stripped of many of its earlier features in order to reduce the selling price. Bright window and running board moldings disappeared, along with the day/night mirror, horn ring, map pocket, locking glove box and miscellaneous other items.

1972 models had an 11% larger rear window ( taller), and the convertible engine lid with four rows of louvres was now used on all Beetles. Inside the vehicle, a four-spoke energy-absorbing steering wheel was introduced, the windshield wiper/washer knob was replaced in favor of a steering column stalk, and intermittent wipers were a new option available in selected markets. An engine compartment socket for the proprietary VW Diagnosis system was also introduced. The rear luggage area was fitted with a folding parcel shelf. A limited-edition Commemorative model was launched in celebration of the Beetle's passing the record of the Ford Model T as the world's most-produced automobile. The Commemorative Beetle was a 1302 S finished in a special Marathon Blue Metallic paint and unique 4.5 x 15 styled steel wheels. In the U.S., it was marketed as the Super Beetle Baja Champion SE.

1973 models featured significantly enlarged "elephant foot" taillamps mounted in reshaped rear fenders. In the engine bay, the oil-bath air cleaner gave way to a dry element filter, and the generator was replaced with an alternator. The 1302/Super became the 1303 with a new taller wrap-around windscreen. The changes to the cowl and windshield resulted in slight redesign of the front hood. The instrument panel, formerly shared with the standard Beetle, was all-new and incorporated a raised speedometer pod, rocker-style switches and side-window defrosters. Front and rear deck lids were finished in matte black, as was all exterior trim with the exception of the chrome headlamp bezels. Inside were corduroy and leatherette high-bolstered sport seats and a small diameter three-spoke steering wheel with padded leather rim and a small red VW logo on the bottom spoke. In North America, the GSR was sold as the Super Beetle Sports Bug. The North American model had body-color deck lids and was available in Marathon Blue Metallic in addition to Saturn Yellow. In some markets, the sport wheels (in both 4.5-inch and 5.5-inch widths), sport steering wheel and sport seats became available as stand-alone options.

On the Super Beetle, the steering knuckle, and consequently the lower attachment point of the strut, was redesigned to improve handling and stability in the event of a tire blowout. A limited-edition Big Beetle was introduced based on the 1303 LS. In the North American market, a limited-edition Sun Bug was introduced as a standard Beetle or Super Beetle. Both were finished in metallic gold and featured styled-steel -wide sport wheels. Inside were brown corduroy and leatherette seats, loop-pile carpet, and padded four-spoke deluxe steering wheel. The Super Beetle Sun Bug included a sliding-steel sunroof. Mid-year, the Love Bug was introduced for North America: based on the standard Beetle, it was available only in Phoenix Red or Ravenna Green (both colors shared with the VW-Porsche 914) with all exterior trim finished in matte black. A price leader, the Love Bug retailed for less than a standard Beetle.

In 1975, front turn indicators were moved from the top of the front fenders down into the bumper. At the rear, the license plate light housing was now molded of plastic with a ribbed top surface. To comply with tightening emission standards, the 1600 cc engine in Japanese and North American markets received Bosch L-Jetronic fuel injection, rather than the D-Jetronic system formerly used in the VW Type 3 and Type 4. The injected engine received a new muffler and in California a catalytic converter. This necessitated a bulge in the rear apron under the rear bumper and replaced the distinctive twin "pea shooter" tailpipes with a single offset pipe, making injected models identifiable at a glance.   bumper-equipped North American models retained fender-top front indicators. The 1303 received rack and pinion steering. In North America, the 1303/Super Beetle sedan was moved upmarket and was now christened La Grande Bug. Similar to the Big Beetle of 1974, La Grande Bug was available in blue or green metallic paint in the U.S. and blue, green or gold metallic in Canada and was equipped with the same features as the 1974 Sun Bug. The "Volkswagen" script on the engine lid of all North American Beetles was replaced with a "Fuel Injection" badge.

In 1976, the 1303/La Grande Bug was discontinued, with the larger body continuing only in convertible form. To make up for the loss in North American markets, the standard Beetle was upgraded, regaining some of the features that were removed in 1971. In addition, the 2-speed ventilation fan was included, previously available in North America only on the larger Beetle. The automatic stickshift option was discontinued as well.

1977 models received new front seats with separate head restraints. This was the final model year for the Beetle sedan in North America. Approximately 1,000 Champagne Editions were produced.

For 1978, a new Champagne second edition convertible was launched, available in blue or red metallic paint with white leatherette interior. Approximately 1,100 were produced.

In 1979, VW offered an Epilogue Edition of the convertible in triple black with features similar to the 1978 Champagne Edition. This would be the last year of convertible production worldwide as well as the final year for the Beetle in the US and Canada.

Introduction to international markets

Ireland 

Volkswagen began its involvement in Ireland when in 1949, Motor Distributors Limited, founded by Stephen O'Flaherty secured the franchise for the country at that year's Paris Motor Show. In 1950, Volkswagen Beetles started arriving into Dublin packed in crates in what was termed "completely knocked down" (CKD) form ready to be assembled. The vehicles were assembled in a former tram depot at 162 Shelbourne Road in Ballsbridge. As of 2021, this was the premises for Ballsbridge Motors, a Mercedes-Benz dealer. The first Volkswagen ever assembled outside Germany was built here. This vehicle is now on display at the Volkswagen Museum in Wolfsburg.

United Kingdom 
In 1952, John Colborne-Baber began to import small numbers of Beetles largely to satisfy demand from US Air Force personnel stationed in Kent. Today, Colborne Garages still hold the Volkswagen franchises for Guildford and Walton-on-Thames. In 1953 J.Gilder & Co. Ltd. in Sheffield, began selling Beetles. Jack Gilder had been fascinated by both the design and engineering of the Beetle when he came across one in Belgium during the war. He applied for the franchise as soon as the opportunity presented itself and became Volkswagen's representative in the North of England. In 2013 the Gilder Group was acquired by JCT600.

Japan 
The Type 1 was introduced to Japan in 1953, and was imported by Yanase dealerships in Japan. Its exterior dimensions and engine displacement were in compliance with Japanese Government regulations, which helped sales. Several Japanese vehicles were introduced after the Beetle was sold in Japan, using an air-cooled engine and rear mounting of the engine, such as the Subaru 360, or an engine installed in the front, like the Honda N360, the Suzuki Fronte, and the Mitsubishi Minica.

International production 
German production of the Beetle took place initially at the parent Wolfsburg plant until the Golf's introduction in 1974, later expanding to the newer Emden and Hanover plants. Volkswagen's takeover of Auto Union in 1964 saw 60,000 cars per year being produced on the Audi assembly lines in Ingolstadt until 4 September 1969. The last German-made cars were assembled at Emden in 1978, after which the Puebla, Mexico, plant became the principal source of Beetle production. Other countries produced Beetles from CKD (complete knockdown kits): Ireland, Thailand, Indonesia, South Africa, Australia, Yugoslavia (city of Sarajevo), and Nigeria have assembled Beetles under licence from VW.

Beetles produced in Mexico and Brazil had several differences:

Brazil 

Brazilian assembly of the Beetle, where it is called "Fusca", started in 1953, with parts imported from Germany. By January 1959 the cars were built in the new São Bernardo do Campo plant, although they originally had 60% German parts content. By the mid-sixties, the cars had 99.93% Brazilian parts content, with four German parts of a combined value of about one US dollar still being imported. Production continued until 1986. In 1993 production resumed and continued to 1996. The Brazilian version retained the 1958–64 body style (Europe and U.S. version) with the thick door pillars and smaller side windows. This body style was also produced in Mexico until 1971. Around 1973, all Brazilian Beetles (1300 and 1500 series) were updated with the 1968-up sheet metal, bumpers, and four-lug rims; although the five-stud rims and "bugeye" headlights were produced as late as 1972 (the base VW 1200 and 1300 manufactured in Brazil was similar to the 1964 European/U.S. 1200 until the 1970 model year but came with vented wheels since the late-1960s). The 1971 and 1972 1300s had the 1964-era taillights and headlights, fuel tank, but fitted with the 1968-up raised bumpers. Brazilian CKD kits were shipped to Nigeria between 1975 and 1987 where Beetles were locally assembled. The Brazilian-produced versions have been sold in neighboring South American nations bordering Brazil, including Argentina, Uruguay, and Peru.

The Brazilian Type 1s have four different engines: 1,200 cc, 1,300 cc, 1,500 cc, and 1,600 cc. In the 1970s, Volkswagen made the SP-2 (derived from the Type 1 pan and the Type 3 powertrain) with a 1,700 cc engine (a bored-out 1,600 cc). In Brazil, the Type 1 never received electronic fuel injection, instead retaining carburetors (one or two one-barrels) throughout its entire life, although the carburetion differs from engines of different years and specification.

The production of the air-cooled engine finally ended in 2006, after more than 60 years.  It was last used in the Brazilian version of the VW Bus, called the "Kombi", and was replaced by a 1.4 L water-cooled engine with a front-mounted cooling system. Volkswagen do Brasil engaged in some string pulling in the early sixties when a law requiring taxis to have four doors and five seats was being considered. After proving that the average taxi fare only carried 1.8 passengers and an overall saving of twenty percent for a smaller two-door car, the Brazilian government relented and the law never entered the books. The Fusca proceeded to have a long career as a taxi in urban Brazil.

Southern Rhodesia 
The Volkswagen Type 1 chassis was used as the basis for a mine-protected APC called the Leopard security vehicle and the Pookie demining vehicle, fielded by the Republic of Rhodesia during the Rhodesian Bush War.

Mexico 

Mexican production began in 1955 because of agreements with companies such as Chrysler in Mexico and the Studebaker-Packard Corporation which assembled cars imported in CKD form. In 1964, they began to be locally produced.  These models have the larger windshield, rear window, door and quarter glass starting in 1972; and the rear window from 1965 to 1971 German built models was used on the Mexican models from 1972 to 1985, when it was replaced with the larger rear window used on 1972 and later German built Beetles. This version, after the mid-1970s, saw little change with the incorporation of electronic ignition in 1988, an anti-theft alarm system in 1990, a catalytic converter in 1991 (as required by law), as well as electronic Digifant fuel injection, hydraulic valve lifters, and a spin-on oil filter in 1993. The front turn signals were located in the bumper instead of the Beetle's traditional placement on top of the front fenders from the 1977 model year on, as they had been on German Beetles sold in Europe from 1975 onwards. Starting in 1995, the Mexican Beetle included front disc brakes, an alternator instead of a generator, and front automatic seat belts. During the 1995 model year, the chrome moldings disappeared leaving body colored bumpers and black moldings instead on some models. By the start of the 1996 model year, exterior chrome or matt moldings were dropped altogether and Volkswagen de Mexico (VWdM) dropped the Sedan's flow-through ventilation system with all its fittings, notably the exterior crescent-shaped vents behind the rear side windows the same year.

In mid-1996, front drum brakes and fixed front seat belts were re-launched in a new budget version called the "Volkswagen Sedán City", which was sold alongside the upscale version "Volkswagen Sedán Clásico" which had front disc brakes, automatic seat belts, right side mirror, velour upholstery, optional metallic colors and wheel covers in matte finish (also found on some 1980s Beetles and Buses). These two versions were sold until mid 1998. From mid 1998–2003, The Sedán Clásico was discontinued and the Sedán City lost its prefix and gained disc brakes, automatic seat belts and optional metallic colors. This last version was named the "Volkswagen Sedán Unificado" or simply the "Volkswagen Sedán".

Independent importers continued to supply several major countries, including Germany, France, and the UK until the end of production in 2003.  Devoted fans of the car even discovered a way to circumvent US safety regulations by placing more recently manufactured Mexican Beetles on the floorpans of earlier, US-registered cars. The Mexican Beetle (along with its Brazilian counterpart) was on the US DOT's (Department of Transportation) hot list of grey market imports after 1978 as the vehicle did not meet safety regulations.

In the Southwest US (Arizona, California, New Mexico, Texas), Mexican Beetles (and some Brazilian T2c Transporters) are a fairly common sight since Mexican nationals can legally operate the vehicle in the United States, provided the cars remain registered in Mexico. Some of the Mexican Beetles have been registered in the United States since the 1998 NHTSA amendment granting the 25-year cutoff where it (and its Brazilian counterpart including the T2C) can be legally registered in any of the 50 states (this means a 1997 or earlier Mexican Beetle as of 2022 can be registered under the current NHTSA 25-year cutoff exemption).

The end of production in Mexico can be attributed primarily to Mexican political measures: the Beetles no longer met emission standards for Mexico City, in which the ubiquitous Beetles were used as taxicabs; and the government outlawed their use as taxicabs because of rising crime rates, requiring only four-door vehicles be used. The last Vocho taxis in Mexico City were retired at the end of 2012. In addition, Volkswagen (now Germany's largest automaker) has been attempting to cultivate a more upscale, premium brand image, and the humble Beetle clashed with this identity, as seen in the Touareg and Passat luxury vehicles. In the late 1990s consumers strongly preferred more modern cars such as the Mexican Chevy, the Nissan Tsuru, and the Volkswagen Pointer and Lupo.

However, demand for the Beetle was relatively high, especially in the 1990s, with the workforce increasing at the start of the decade. The price of the base model (without even a radio) was pegged with the official minimum wage, by an agreement between the company and the government. In 1990 it cost US$5,300.

Australia 
Official importation of the Volkswagen Beetle into Australia began in 1953, with local assembly operations commencing the following year. Volkswagen Australia was formed in 1957, and by 1960 locally produced body panels were being used for the first time. When the European Type One body received the larger windows for the 1965 model year, Volkswagen Australia decided not to update, but continued to produce the smaller-windowed bodies, with unique features to the Australian versions. This was due to the limited size of the market and the costs involved in retooling. Australian content had reached almost 95% by this time. The Australian subsidiary continued to produce the earlier body style until 1967, when declining sales forced a switch to CKD assembly using imported components the following year. In 1968, Volkswagen Australia released its own locally designed utilitarian version of the Type 1, the Volkswagen Country Buggy or Type 197.

The last Australian-assembled Beetle was produced in July 1976 with assembly of other models ending in February 1977. All Volkswagens for the Australian market have been fully imported since then.

South Africa 

The Beetle was also produced in South Africa at the Uitenhage plant from 31 August 1951 to 1979. Several features from the Super Beetle were grafted onto the South African Beetle 1600S, such as curved windshield, new dashboard, and larger taillights, while retaining the Beetle chassis and mechanicals. The 1600 model was introduced to South Africa in 1972; it was marketed as the cheapest 1.6-liter car available there. In late 1976, the sporty SP 1600 Beetle arrived – this version received bright red, yellow, or silver paint with black stripes, a front spoiler, wide tyres, and a more powerful engine with twin carburettors and a freer flowing exhaust. The interior was also sporty, with red tartan upholstery, a small steering wheel, and much matte black. Also new for 1977 were rubber bumper strips for all 1600s, and the same taillights with backup lights were now fitted across the range.

The bigger-engined model was then phased out around August 1978, leaving only the 1300 model in production.

Influence claims
Various cars and designs have each claimed to have been the original influencers of Porsche's Volkswagen concept, or subsequently been influenced by the original design.

Béla Barényi

The Austro-Hungarian automotive engineer Béla Barényi is credited with designing a similarly shaped car in 1925, as early as five years before Porsche's People's car concept was unveiled.

Standard Superior

German engineer Josef Ganz designed a car called "Maybug", that is very similar to the Volkswagen Beetle. Hitler saw the car in 1933 at an auto show. There is a strong resemblance to the Standard Superior, an automobile produced from 1933 to 1935 by Standard Fahrzeugfabrik of Ludwigsburg, Germany, founded by motorcycle maker Wilhelm Gutbrod and unrelated to the Standard Motor Company of England. These small cars were designed according to the patents by Josef Ganz and featured transverse, two-stroke, two-cylinder engines mounted in front of the rear axle. However, Porsche, two years prior to the Standard Superior's introduction, had developed the Type 12 for Zündapp, already featuring many design similarities with the Volkswagen Beetle.

Tatra

The Austrian car designer Hans Ledwinka was a contemporary of Porsche working at the Czechoslovakian company Tatra. In 1931, Tatra built the V570 prototype, which had an air-cooled flat-twin engine mounted at the rear. This was followed in 1933 by a second V570 prototype with a streamlined body similar to that of the Porsche Type 32. The rear-engine, rear-wheel drive layout was a challenge for effective air cooling, and during development of the much larger V8 engined Tatra 77 in 1933 Tatra registered numerous patents related to air flow into the rear engine compartment. The use of Tatra's patented air cooling designs later became one of ten issues for which Tatra filed suit against VW.

Both Hitler and Porsche were influenced by the Tatras. Hitler was a keen automotive enthusiast, and had ridden in Tatras during political tours of Czechoslovakia. He had also dined numerous times with Ledwinka. After one of these dinners Hitler remarked to Porsche, "This is the car for my roads". From 1933 onwards, Ledwinka and Porsche met regularly to discuss their designs, and Porsche admitted "Well, sometimes I looked over his shoulder and sometimes he looked over mine" while designing the Volkswagen. The Tatra 97 of 1936 had a 1,749 cc, rear-located, rear-wheel drive, air-cooled four-cylinder boxer engine. It cost 5,600 RM and accommodated five passengers in its extensively streamlined four-door body, which provided luggage storage under the front bonnet and behind the rear seats. It also featured a similar central structural tunnel found in the Beetle.

Just before the start of the Second World War, Tatra had ten legal claims filed against VW for infringement of patents. Although Ferdinand Porsche was about to pay a settlement to Tatra, he was stopped by Hitler who said he would "solve his problem". Tatra launched a lawsuit, but this was stopped when Germany invaded Czechoslovakia in 1938, resulting in the Tatra factory coming under Nazi administration in October 1938. The T97, along with the T57, were ordered by Hitler to be removed from the Tatra display at the 1939 Berlin Autosalon and Tatra was later directed to concentrate on heavy trucks and diesel engines, with all car models, except for the V8-engined Tatra 87, being discontinued. The matter was re-opened after World War II and in 1965 Volkswagen paid Ringhoffer-Tatra 1,000,000 Deutsche Marks in an out of court settlement.

Fedden

On Sept 28, 1943, Roy Fedden, most known by his participation in the Bristol Single Sleeve valve engine research, headed by Harry Ricardo, applied for a British patent 'Improvements related to road vehicles', granted GB570814, 24 July 1945, describing a 2-door, rear-engined car, identical in arrangement and look to VW 'Käfer'. Espacenet - Original document

Tjaarda's 'Briggs Dream Car'
It has also been pointed out that the VW Beetle bears a striking resemblance to John Tjaarda's 1933 design for a streamlined, rear-engined car, that he created working for Briggs Manufacturing Company. At Briggs, a Detroit-based manufacturer of automobile bodies for Ford Motor Company, Chrysler Corporation and other U.S. and European automobile manufacturers, Tjaarda was developing a radical car for Ford to use as a new Lincoln. Ford displayed the show car at the 1933–34 Century of Progress Exhibition in Chicago as the "Briggs Dream Car". One of the later designs looked almost exactly like the Beetle, if you shortened the wheelbase, and took out two side windows. It is even claimed that Porsche had visited Briggs automobiles one summer, when Tjaarda was head of R&D there, and several auto historians claim Porsche's People's Car was influenced by Tjaarda's designs, including the "Sterkenburg series" of the late twenties.

Motorsport

Drag racing 

The Beetle has been modified for use in drag racing; its rearward (RR layout) weight distribution keeps the weight over the rear wheels, maximizing grip off the starting line. The car's weight is reduced for a full competition drag Beetle, further improving the grip and also the power-to-weight ratio. Combined with the Beetle's RR layout, wheelies can be achieved easily, but time "in the air" worsens 1/4-mile time. To prevent this, "wheelie bars" were added. A notable version, campaigned in the USA was the EMPI Inch Pincher.

Formula Vee 

The Beetle is also used as the basis for the Formula Vee open-wheel racing category: specifically, the front suspension crossmember assembly (the shock absorber mounts are sometimes removed, depending on regulations in the class), and the engine and transaxle assembly (usually the earlier swing-axle type, not the later double-jointed axle).
In original 1,200 cc Formula Vee spec, upgrades to the cars would only be allowed sparsely, so that the wheels, tires and engines didn't differ very much from the original Beetle. In this configuration, FV would become one of the most popular entry-level motorsports classes of its time.

Later on, double carbs and more extensive modification would be allowed, leading to the more powerful Super Vee class featuring wings for downforce and  engines, which in the end had fairly little in common with the original VW Beetle.

Uniroyal Fun Cup 

Volkswagen Beetle-style bodies are fitted to space frame racing chassis, and are used in the Uniroyal Fun Cup, which includes the longest continuous motor-race in the world, the 25 Hours of Spa. It is an affordable entry-level series that gentleman drivers race.

Rally and Rallycross 
Especially the Austrian sole distributor Porsche Salzburg (now Porsche Austria) seriously entered the Volkswagen in local and European contests in the 1960s and early 1970s. Starting with the VW 1500, in the mid-1960s the peak of their racing performance was achieved with the VW 1302S and VW 1303S (known as the Salzburg Rally Beetle) from 1971 to 1973. The vehicles were entered in such famous races as TAP (Portugal), Austrian Alpine, Elba, Acropolis etc. Drivers were top performers such as Tony Fall (GB), Guenter Janger (AUT), Harry Källström (S), Achim Warmbold (D), Franz Wurz (A), etc. The engines were highly modified 1600s delivering , later on mated to a Porsche 914 five-speed manual gearbox. Victories were achieved in 1973 on Elba for overall and class, Acropolis for class (5th overall), Austrian championship 1972, 1973 January Rallye for overall and class. Rally of 1000 minutes for overall second (first in class).

The fuel crisis, along with the arrival of the Volkswagen Golf (Rabbit), put an end to the days of unofficially supported rallying in 1974. All vehicles either used for training or actual racing were sold off to privateers, many kept racing with noticeable results until the early 1980s.

Trans-Am Series 

Beetles were used in the Trans-Am Series for the two-litre class from 1966 to 1967 and again in 1972.

Armstrong 500
A Volkswagen won its class in the Armstrong 500 in Australia in both 1962 and 1963.

Baja 1000 

The Baja 1000 off-road race in the Baja California Peninsula, Mexico includes specific vehicle classes for both standard Beetles and Baja Bugs. These can be seen in the documentary movie Dust to Glory.

The classes are:

 Class 5: Unlimited Baja Bugs
 Class 5-1600: 1,600 cc Baja Bugs
 Class 11: Stock VW sedans

Beetle Challenge 

The Beetle Challenge is a UK-based circuit racing championship for classic air-cooled Volkswagen Beetles. The general concept is to take any Beetle, of any age or model from the 40s through to 1303s, and with minimal restrictions, allowing parts from various years to be interchanged, and of course the cars being prepared to the MSA safety requirements (cage, restraints, fire system etc.) Essentially the cars must be air-cooled Beetles (any age and parts can be swapped between years and models), with a 15-inch x 6-inch max wheel size with a control tyre. Engines must be based on a Type 1 case, with no electronic fuel injection or ignition and no forced induction, with an unlimited capacity. Other regulations apply.

Retrofit program 
Volkswagen has entered into partnership with eClassics to allow Beetle owners to convert their car to electric.

In popular culture 
The Volkswagen Beetle has appeared in several popular culture material.

 The Beetle would serve as the basis for Herbie, a fictional race car with a mind of its own, who had appeared in several movies, such as The Love Bug and Herbie Goes to Monte Carlo. 
 The Beetle would also serve as the basis for the vehicle mode of the Transformers character Bumblebee, a fictional robot that transforms into a car, who had appeared as a Beetle in a series of toy lines, as well as tv shows and movies. 
 Superbug is another fictional Volkswagen Beetle and the protagonist of a series of West German movies. 
 In the 1972 comedy film What's Up, Doc?, a Beetle becomes part of a car chase before it ended up floating in San Francisco Bay. 
 In the 1973 film Sleeper, starring Woody Allen, a Beetle is started up after being abandoned inside a cave for over 200 years.

See also
Black Current
Cal looker
Cal-Style VW
DKW F9
List of names for the Volkswagen Type 1
Meyers Manx
ORA Punk Cat
Punch buggy
Saab 92
Steyr 50
Tatra 87
Trabant
Volksrod
Volkswagen advertising
Volksworld (magazine)

Explanatory notes

References

Further reading 
 Copping, Richard, VW Beetle: The Car of the 20th Century, 2014.
 
 Imseng, Dominik. Ugly Is Only Skin-Deep: The Story of the Ads That Changed the World. Matador, 2016. .
 Margolius, Ivan, & John G Henry, Tatra: The Legacy of Hans Ledwinka, Dorchester: Veloce, 2015. .
 Nelson, Walter Henry, Small Wonder: The Amazing Story of the Volkswagen, Boston: Little, Brown, 1967.
 Rieger, Bernhard, The People's Car: A Global History of the Volkswagen Beetle. Harvard University Press, 2013.

 Videos
 Archived at Ghostarchive and the Wayback Machine:

External links 

 
 The Beetle: From Hitler to Hippies: slideshow by Life
History of the Volkswagen Super Beetle

 
1940s cars
1950s cars
1960s cars
1970s cars
1980s cars
1990s cars
2000s cars
Cars introduced in 1938
Cars discontinued in 2003
Cars powered by boxer engines
Cars powered by rear-mounted 4-cylinder engines
Compact cars
Convertibles
Ferdinand Porsche
First car made by manufacturer
German inventions of the Nazi period
Rally cars
Rear-engined vehicles
Sedans
Taxi vehicles